Tony Coyle (born 29 October 1976) is a retired South African footballer.

External links

1976 births
Living people
South African soccer players
South Africa international soccer players
South African expatriate soccer players
Russian Premier League players
FC Rostov players
SuperSport United F.C. players
Orlando Pirates F.C. players
Bidvest Wits F.C. players
2004 African Cup of Nations players
Expatriate footballers in Russia
South African expatriate sportspeople in Russia
Association football defenders
White South African people